Larry Carroll may refer to:

 Lawrence Carroll, album cover artist
 Larry Carroll (director) (died 2015), television director